Jan Soetens (born 7 January 1984) is a Belgian former professional racing cyclist.

Major results
2001–2002
 3rd National Junior Championships
2004–2005
 1st  National Under-23 Championships
 Under-23 Superprestige
2nd Vorselaar
2005–2006
 2nd  UEC European Under-23 Championships
2006–2007
 1st Grand Prix Julien Cajot
2007–2008
 1st  National Amateur Championships
 2nd Grand Prix Julien Cajot
 3rd Kasteelcross Zonnebeke
2009–2010
 2nd Steinmaur

External links

1984 births
Living people
People from Geraardsbergen
Belgian male cyclists
Cyclo-cross cyclists
Cyclists from East Flanders